Ulm is an electoral constituency (German: Wahlkreis) represented in the Bundestag. It elects one member via first-past-the-post voting. Under the current constituency numbering system, it is designated as constituency 291. It is located in eastern Baden-Württemberg, comprising the city of Ulm and the district of Alb-Donau-Kreis.

Ulm was created for the inaugural 1949 federal election. Since 2017, it has been represented by Ronja Kemmer of the Christian Democratic Union (CDU).

Geography
Ulm is located in eastern Baden-Württemberg. As of the 2021 federal election, it comprises the independent city of Ulm and the district of Alb-Donau-Kreis.

History
Ulm was created in 1949. In the 1949 election, it was Württemberg-Baden Landesbezirk Württemberg constituency 8 in the numbering system. In the 1953 through 1961 elections, it was number 170. In the 1965 through 1976 elections, it was number 173. In the 1980 through 1998 elections, it was number 195. In the 2002 and 2005 elections, it was number 292. Since the 2009 election, it has been number 291.

Originally, the constituency comprised the independent city of Ulm and the districts of Landkreis Ulm and Heidenheim. In the 1965 through 1976 elections, it comprised the city of Ulm and the Landkreis Ulm district. It acquired its current borders in the 1980 election.

Members
The constituency has been held continuously by Christian Democratic Union (CDU) since its creation. It was first represented by Ludwig Erhard from 1949 to 1972. Erhard served as Chancellor from 1963 to 1966. Herbert Werner served as representative from 1972 to 1994, followed by Heinz Seiffert 1994 to 2002. Annette Schavan then served from 2002 to 2017. Ronja Kemmer was elected in 2017 and re-elected in 2021.

Election results

2021 election

2017 election

2013 election

2009 election

References

Federal electoral districts in Baden-Württemberg
1949 establishments in West Germany
Constituencies established in 1949
Ulm
Alb-Donau-Kreis